Victor Wesley dos Santos da Silva (born 21 April 1998), known as Victor Paraíba, is a Brazilian footballer who plays as an attacking midfielder for Portuguesa-RJ.

Club career
Born in Campina Grande, Paraíba, Victor Paraíba joined CSA's youth setup in 2018, from Sport Recife. He made his first team debut on 1 September 2018, coming on as a second-half substitute for Daniel Costa in a 0–3 Série B away loss against Boa Esporte.

Victor Paraíba scored his first senior goal on 17 March 2019, netting the equalizer in a 1–1 away draw against Coruripe for the Campeonato Alagoano championship. He made his Série A debut on 5 May, replacing Naldo in a 0–0 home draw against Santos.

On 10 May 2019, Victor Paraíba renewed his contract until 2023. On 17 September, he was loaned to Atlético Goianiense for the remainder of the 2019 Série B.

Back at CSA for the 2020 campaign, Victor Paraíba was sparingly used by the club, and terminating his contract on 10 February 2021; he immediately returned to Atlético Goianiense.

Career statistics

References

External links
Futebol de Goyaz profile 

1998 births
Living people
People from Campina Grande
Brazilian footballers
Association football midfielders
Campeonato Brasileiro Série A players
Campeonato Brasileiro Série B players
Campeonato Brasileiro Série D players
Centro Sportivo Alagoano players
Atlético Clube Goianiense players
Associação Ferroviária de Esportes players
Associação Atlética Portuguesa (RJ) players
Sportspeople from Paraíba